The Customs Act 1967, is a Malaysian law, enacted by the Parliament of Malaysia, relating to customs. Many subsequent amendments to it have also been passed.

Structure
The Customs Act 1967, in its current form, consists of 21 Parts containing 169 sections and 1 schedule (including 24 amendments).
 Part I: Preliminary
 Part II: Appointment and Powers of Officers
 Part III: Levying of Customs Duties
 Part IV: Importation and Exportation
 Part V: Port Clearances
 Part VI: General Provisions Affecting Vessels in Territorial Waters
 Part VII: Manifests
 Part VIII: Warehousing
 Part IX: Declaration of Goods
 A—Dutiable goods
 B—Non-dutiable goods
 C—General Provisions
 Part X: Drawback
 Part XI: Miscellaneous Provisions
 Part XII: Inspection, Investigation, Search, Seizure and Arrest
 Part XIII: Provisions as to Trials and Proceedings
 Part XIV: Offences and Penalties
 Part XV: Regulations
 Part XVI: General
 Part XVII: Special Provisions Dealing with Penang
 Part XVIII: Special Provisions Dealing with Labuan
 Part XIX: Special Provisions Dealing with Sabah and Sarawak
 Part XIXA: Special Provisions Dealing with Langkawi
 Part XIXB: Special Provisions Dealing with the Joint Development Area
 Part XIXC: Special Provisions Dealing with Tioman
 Part XX: Singapore Preventive Vessels
 Part XXI: Repeal
 Schedule

References

External links
 Customs Act 1967 

1967 in Malaysian law
Malaysian federal legislation